Scot Dapp (born September 27, 1951) is a former American football and baseball coach. He served as the head football coach at Moravian College in Bethlehem, Pennsylvania from 1987 to 2010, compiling a record of 144–103–1. Dapp was also the head baseball coach at Susquehanna University in Selinsgrove, Pennsylvania from 1980 to 1985, tallying a mark of 74–66. He was the president of the American Football Coaches Association in 2005.

Dapp is a 1973 graduate of West Chester University of Pennsylvania.  He earned a master's degree from the University of North Carolina at Chapel Hill.

Prior to coming to Moravian he was an assistant coach at Kutztown University of Pennsylvania, Delaware State College, and Susquehanna.

Dapp was MAC Commonwealth League Coach-of-the-Year three times.

Head coaching record

Football

References

1951 births
Living people
American softball coaches
Moravian Greyhounds softball coaches
Delaware State Hornets football coaches
Kutztown Golden Bears football coaches
Moravian Greyhounds football coaches
Susquehanna River Hawks baseball coaches
Susquehanna River Hawks football coaches
West Chester University alumni
University of North Carolina at Chapel Hill alumni